Francesco Botti (1640–1711) was an Italian painter of the Baroque period, active in his native Florence.

Biography
His father, Giovanni was also a painter. Like his mentor Simone Pignoni, he specialized in depicting persons or scenes from classical mythology or the bible, depicting the women in seductive poses. Among his paintings are:
Diana and Acteon
Sophonisbae, Museo Civico di Montepulciano
Judgement of Paris
Allegory of Geometry, Museo di Beaux Arts of Arras
Saints of the Augustinian Order for  Santa Maria dei Candeli
Self-portrait in the Uffizi
Story of Santa Rosalia, Museo della Fondazione Primo Conti in Fiesole
A Nativity and an Ecstasy of Ste Margherita, Cappella Corsini in Santo Spirito, Florence

Among his pupils was Matteo Bonechi.

Bibliography
Sandro Bellesi, Inediti di Simone Pignoni e Francesco Botti in Arte, collezionismo, conservazione: scritti in onore di Marco Chiarini.
Francesca Baldassarri, La Pittura del Seicento a Firenze, Robilant-Voena, Torino 2009

1640 births
1711 deaths
Painters from Tuscany
Italian Baroque painters
17th-century Italian painters
18th-century Italian painters